Mansueto "Onyok" Velasco Jr. (born January 10, 1974) is a Filipino retired boxer, comedian and actor from Bago, Negros Occidental, Philippines. Competing in the 48 kg category he won a gold medal at the 1994 Asian Games and a silver at the 1996 Summer Olympics, the Philippines' only medal at those Games. He is the younger brother of Roel Velasco, a light-flyweight boxer who won a bronze medal at the 1992 Olympics in Barcelona.

Olympic results 
Defeated Chih-Hsiu Tsai (Taiwan) RSC 1 (2:27)
Defeated Yosvani Aguilera (Cuba) 14–5
Defeated Hamid Berhili (Morocco) 20–10
Defeated Rafael Lozano (Spain) 22–10
Lost to Daniel Petrov (Bulgaria) 6–19

Acting career
Velasco retired from boxing due to lack of government support and pursued an acting career, stating that he found it more financially sustainable. His life and boxing career was featured in the 1997 film The Onyok Velasco Story, where he played himself. This marked his first venture into acting.

Velasco later had a successful career as a comedian, appearing in several sitcoms and comedy films, including Show Me Da Manny on GMA 7. He also played the role of a boxing trainer on the TV5 comedy-drama Beki Boxer.

Unfulfilled incentives
For his feat in the 1996 Summer Olympics, he received pledges of monetary and non-monetary incentives. However not all of these pledges materialized as of 2021 including a  pledge by the House of Representatives in 1996 and the title for the house and lot he received.

Filmography

Television
Tarajing Pot Pot (ABS-CBN 2)
GMA Supershow (GMA 7) - guest
ASAP Natin To (ABS-CBN 2)
Magandang Tanghali Bayan (ABS-CBN 2)
Tropang Trumpo (TV5) – guest
Maalaala Mo Kaya (ABS-CBN 2)
Richard Loves Lucy (ABS-CBN 2)
Ispup (TV5)
Da Body En Da Guard (ABS-CBN 2)
Da Pilya En Da Pilot (ABS-CBN 2)
Idol Ko Si Kap (GMA 7)
OK Fine Whatever (ABS-CBN 2)
OK Fine Oh Yes! (ABS-CBN 2)
OK Fine Ito Ang Gusto Niyo (ABS-CBN 2)
Kool Ka Lang (GMA 7)
Magpakailanman (GMA 7)
Kamao: Matira't Matibay (ABS-CBN 2) – co host
Extra Challenge (GMA 7)
Sabi Ni Nanay (SOLAR TV)
Kemis: Kay Misis Umasa (SOLAR TV)
Maynila (GMA 7)
Baywalk (QTV 11)
Talentadong Pinoy (TV5) – judge
It's Showtime (ABS-CBN 2) – celebrity judge
Everybodi Hapi (TV5)
Pinoy Records Presents: Pinoy Extreme Talent (GMA 7) – judge
Show Me Da Manny (GMA 7)
Ang Pinaka (GMA News TV 11)
Totoo TV (TV5) – guest
Magic Palayok (GMA 7)
Manny Many Prizes (GMA 7)
Toda Max (ABS-CBN 2)
Pepito Manaloto (GMA 7) – guest
Beki Boxer (TV5) – Ninong Onyok
Celebrity Bluff (GMA 7)
Wasak (Aksyon TV 41)
Tunay Na Buhay (GMA 7)
Matanglawin (ABS-CBN 2) – guest 
A-Ha! (GMA 7) – guest
Demolition Job (TV5)
Don't Lose The Money (GMA 7) – guest
Basta't Everyday Happy (GMA 7) – guest
Astig (TV5)
Ismol Family (GMA 7) – guest
Sabado Badoo (GMA 7)
Mac & Chiz (TV5)
Sunday Pinasaya (GMA 7)
Till I Met You (ABS-CBN 2) - guest
My Super D (ABS-CBN 2) - guest
Langit Lupa (ABS-CBN 2) - guest
Dear Uge (GMA 7)
FPJ Ang Probinsyano (ABS-CBN 2) - guest
Home Sweetie Home (ABS-CBN 2) - guest
La Luna Sangre (ABS-CBN 2) - guest
Alyas Robin Hood (GMA 7) - guest
Wansapanataym Presents: Amazing Ving (ABS-CBN 2) - guest
Cain At Abel (GMA 7) - guest
Victor Magtanggol (GMA 7)
Precious Hearts Presents: Los Bastardos (ABS-CBN 2)
The General's Daughter (ABS-CBN 2) - guest
Magandang Buhay (A2Z 11) - guest
Mars Pa More (GMA 7) - guest
My First Yaya (GMA 7) - guest
John En Ellen (TV5) - guest
Huwag Kang Mangamba (A2Z 11) - guest
Niña Niño (TV5) - guest

References

External links

1974 births
Boxers at the 1996 Summer Olympics
Filipino male comedians
Living people
Olympic boxers of the Philippines
Olympic silver medalists for the Philippines
Boxers from Negros Occidental
Male actors from Negros Occidental
Olympic medalists in boxing
Medalists at the 1996 Summer Olympics
Asian Games medalists in boxing
Boxers at the 1994 Asian Games
Filipino male boxers
Asian Games gold medalists for the Philippines
Medalists at the 1994 Asian Games
Light-flyweight boxers
Filipino male television actors